Rancocas State Park is a  protected area designated as a state park located in Hainesport Township and Westampton Township, Burlington County, New Jersey in the United States. Established in 1965, it is overseen and operated by the New Jersey Division of Parks and Forestry. The park is located along the North Branch of the Rancocas Creek and an extensive freshwater tidal marsh.

References

State parks of New Jersey
Parks in Burlington County, New Jersey
Hainesport Township, New Jersey
Westampton Township, New Jersey